Bachelor Party is a 1984 American sex comedy film directed by Neal Israel, written by Israel and Pat Proft, and starring Tom Hanks, Adrian Zmed, William Tepper, and Tawny Kitaen. The film revolves around a bachelor party that a group of men throw for their friend Rick Gassko (Hanks) on the eve of his wedding and whether he can remain faithful to his fiancée Debbie (Kitaen).

Plot
Party animal Rick Gassko (Tom Hanks), who makes his living as a Catholic-school bus driver, decides to settle down and marry his girlfriend Debbie Thompson (Tawny Kitaen). After learning the news of the engagement, Rick's shocked friends, led by Jay (Adrian Zmed), decide to throw him an epic bachelor party. The bride's wealthy, conservative parents are unhappy with her decision, and her father enlists the help of Debbie's ex-boyfriend Cole Whittier (Robert Prescott) to sabotage her relationship with Rick and win her back.

While Debbie worries and goes off to a bridal shower thrown by her friends, Rick heads to the bachelor party, which takes place in a lavish, spacious hotel suite, and promises to remain faithful. Both parties start off on the wrong foot because of Cole's meddling. As the bachelor party starts to heat up, Debbie and the girls decide to get even with Rick and his friends by having a party of their own. Both parties eventually collide, leading to Debbie accusing Rick of infidelity.

The bachelor party becomes a wild, drunken orgy and the hotel room is trashed, which infuriates the hotel's frustrated manager (Kenneth Kimmins). Adding to the confusion is Rick's friend Brad, who has become despondent over the breakup of his marriage and botches several suicide attempts. When Brad tries to slit his wrists with an electric razor, Rick says, "Well.....at least your wrists will be smooth and kissable."

Rick convinces Debbie of his love and faithfulness just as the party is raided by the police. In the ensuing melee, Rick and Debbie become separated and Cole kidnaps Debbie, so Rick and his friends chase after them. The chase culminates in a showdown between Rick and Cole in a 36-screen movie theater, with a fist fight taking place in synchronization with a similar fight being shown in a 3D film projected behind them; the audience believes that the real fight is an extraordinary 3D effect. Rick wins the fight and is reunited with Debbie.

After the wedding, Rick and Debbie are driven to the airport for their honeymoon in Rick's school bus, which is driven by a laughing Brad.

Cast

 Tom Hanks as Richard Ernesto "Rick" Gassko
 Tawny Kitaen as Deborah Julie "Debbie" Thompson
 Adrian Zmed as Jay O'Neill
 George Grizzard as Ed Thompson
 Barbara Stuart as Mrs. Thompson
 Robert Prescott as Cole Whittier
 William Tepper as Dr. Stanley "Stan" Gassko
 Wendie Jo Sperber as Dr. Tina Gassko
 Barry Diamond as Rudy
 Tracy Smith as Bobbi
 Gary Grossman as Gary
 Michael Dudikoff as Ryko
 Gerard Prendergast as Mike
 Deborah Harmon as Ilene
 Kenneth Kimmins as Parkview Hotel Manager
 Rosanne Katon as Bridal Shower Hooker
 Christopher Morley as She-Tim (cross-dresser)
 Brett Baxter Clark as Nick (credited as Brett Clark)
 Monique Gabrielle as Tracey
 Angela Aames as Mrs. Klupner
 Hugh McPhillips as Father O'Donnell
 Billy Beck as Patient
 Milt Kogan as Restaurant Customer
 Pat Proft as Screaming Man (Newlywed)
 Tad Horino as Japanese Businessman
 Toni Alessandrini as Miss Desiree, exotic dancer with Max the Magical Sexual Mule
 Bradford Bancroft as Brad
 Jessica Meier and Michelle Meier as Timmy Klupner

Casting

Jim Carrey, Tim Robbins, and Howie Mandel were considered for the role of Rick Gassko.

Production
The idea for the film came from an actual bachelor party thrown by producer Ron Moler and a group of friends for fellow producer Bob Israel. Several members of the film's cast and crew were at that party when the idea began to take shape.

The film was made in the wake of the success of Police Academy.

Music

The soundtrack album from Bachelor Party was released in 1984.

Side one
 "American Beat '84 (Theme for a Bachelor Party)" – The Fleshtones (3:28)
 "Something Isn't Right" – Oingo Boingo (3:42)
 "Crazy Over You" – Jools Holland (2:59)
 "Little Demon" – Adrian Zmed (3:21)
 "Windout" – R.E.M. (1:58)
Side two
 "Bachelor Party" – Oingo Boingo (3:49)
 "What Kind of Hell" – The Alarm (2:43)
 "Alley Oop" – Darlene Love (3:57)
 "Why Do Good Girls Like Bad Boys?" – Angel and the Reruns (2:10)
 "Dream of the West" – Yip Yip Coyote (3:07)

The film also features these songs:
 "Dance Hall Days" – Wang Chung
 "Rehumanize Yourself" – The Police
 "Nature Took Over" – Angel and the Reruns
 "Gotta Give a Little Love" – Timmy Thomas
 "Prepare to Energize" – Torch Song
 "Who Do You Want to Be" – Oingo Boingo
 "Hall of Fame" – The Fleshtones

Reception
Reviews for Bachelor Party were mixed, holding a rating of 54% on Rotten Tomatoes based on 28 reviews. While some critics appreciated the humor, others found it to be vulgar and gratuitous. Film critics Roger Ebert and Janet Maslin both recommended the film, but had reservations about certain aspects, calling it "sophomoric" and "not a great film."

In a Los Angeles Times review, writer Kevin Thomas praised Hanks as "likable, spontaneous zany" but felt that the film was 15 minutes too long: "That extra 15 minutes allows for just enough repetition (and just enough lingering over as much outrageous sexual connotation that an R rating permits) to let heavy-handed tastelessness creep in and dampen the fun."

Sequel
Twenty-four years after Bachelor Party was released, 20th Century Fox Home Entertainment produced a straight-to-DVD sequel (in name only) called Bachelor Party 2: The Last Temptation.

TV show
On October 21, 2014, it was reported that ABC would develop a TV show inspired by the film.

References

External links
 
 
 
 
 
 

1984 films
1980s sex comedy films
20th Century Fox films
American sex comedy films
American slapstick comedy films
1980s English-language films
Films about parties
Films directed by Neal Israel
Films scored by Robert Folk
Films set in Los Angeles
Films shot in Los Angeles
Films with screenplays by Neal Israel
Films with screenplays by Pat Proft
1984 comedy films
Films set in a movie theatre
1980s American films